Dădești may refer to several villages in Romania:

 Dădești, a village in Vultureni Commune, Bacău County
 Dădești, a village in Ion Neculce Commune, Iași County